Massachusetts Senate's 1st Hampden and Hampshire district in the United States is one of 40 legislative districts of the Massachusetts Senate. It covers 30.1% of Hampden County and 13.2% of Hampshire County population. Democrat Eric Lesser of Longmeadow has represented the district since 2015.

Locales represented
The district includes the following localities:
 Belchertown
 part of Chicopee
 East Longmeadow
 Granby
 Hampden
 Longmeadow
 Ludlow
 part of Springfield
 Wilbraham

The current district geographic boundary overlaps with those of the Massachusetts House of Representatives' 2nd Franklin, 2nd Hampden, 7th Hampden, 8th Hampden, 9th Hampden, 10th Hampden, 11th Hampden, 12th Hampden, 2nd Hampshire, and 3rd Hampshire districts.

Senators 
 John P. Burke, circa 1979-1985 
 Brian Lees, 1989-2007 
 Gale D. Candaras, 2007-2015
 Eric Lesser, 2015–present

Images
Portraits of legislators

See also
 List of Massachusetts Senate elections
 Other Hampden County districts of the Massachusett Senate: Berkshire, Hampshire, Franklin, and Hampden; Hampden; 2nd Hampden and Hampshire
 Other Hampshire County districts of the Massachusett Senate: Berkshire, Hampshire, Franklin, and Hampden; 2nd Hampden and Hampshire; Hampshire, Franklin and Worcester
 Hampden County districts of the Massachusetts House of Representatives: 1st, 2nd, 3rd, 4th, 5th, 6th, 7th, 8th, 9th, 10th, 11th, 12th
 Hampshire County districts of the Massachusetts House of Representatives: 1st, 2nd, 3rd
 List of Massachusetts General Courts
 List of former districts of the Massachusetts Senate

References

External links
 Ballotpedia
  (State Senate district information based on U.S. Census Bureau's American Community Survey).
 
 League of Women Voters of Northampton Area

Senate
Government of Hampden County, Massachusetts
Government of Hampshire County, Massachusetts
Massachusetts Senate